Jung-in, also spelled Jeong-in, is a Korean unisex given name.

People with this name include:
 Seo Jeong-in (born 1936), South Korean male novelist
 Moon Chung-in (born 1951), South Korean male political scientist
 Choi Jung-in (born 1980), South Korean female pop singer
 Park Jeong-in (born 2000), South Korean male footballer
 Yang Jeong-in (born 2001), stage name I.N, South Korean male singer, member of boy group Stray Kids
Jung-in case, which centered on a 16 month old girl who died on October 20, 2020 by after months of abuse by hands of her adoptive parents that caused outrage in South Korea 

Korean unisex given names